Utricularia biloba, the moth bladderwort, is a perennial, terrestrial or aquatic carnivorous plant that belongs to the genus Utricularia (family Lentibulariaceae). It is endemic to Australia with a distribution along the coastal regions of New South Wales and Queensland.

See also 
 List of Utricularia species

References 

Carnivorous plants of Australia
Flora of Queensland
Flora of New South Wales
biloba
Lamiales of Australia